Dumnagual II (Modern ; died 694) was a ruler of the Kingdom of Strathclyde in present-day Scotland for some time in the late seventh century. He is known only from his death notice in the Irish annals. The Annals of Ulster, under the year 694, has Domnall m. Auin, rex Alo Cluathe, moritur ("Domnall, son of Aun, king of Alt Clut, dies"). Dumnagual is the Old Welsh equivalent of Domnall, and Aun is certainly Eugein, probably to be identified with King Eugein I of Alt Clut.

References
 MacQuarrie, Alan, "The Kings of Strathclyde", in A. Grant & K.Stringer (eds.) Medieval Scotland: Crown, Lordship and Community, Essays Presented to G.W.S. Barrow, (Edinburgh, 1993), pp. 1–19

External links
 Annals of Ulster

694 deaths
Monarchs of Strathclyde
7th-century Scottish monarchs
Year of birth unknown